Zafarnama (lit. Book of Victory) is the title of a number of Persian and Turkish literary works

Zafarnama may also refer to:
 Zafar-Namah or Timur-Namah of Hatefi, by a Persian epic poet dedicated to Timur
 Zafarnama (Shami biography), a history of the ruler Timur by Nizam ad-Din Shami
 Zafarnama (Yazdi biography), a second history of the ruler Timur's career by the Persian historian Sharaf ad-Din Ali Yazdi
Garrett Zafarnama, a manuscript of the last, now in Baltimore
 Zafarnamah (Mustawfi), epic poem by the Persian epic poet Hamdollah Mostowfi
 Zafarnama (letter), a message to the Mughal emperor Aurangzeb from the Sikh leader Guru Gobind Singh
 Zafername, a satire written in 1870 by Ziya Pasha
 Zafarnamah Ranjit Singh, a chronicle history of Ranjit Singh (1780–1839), compiled by Diwan Amar Nath (c. 1837)

See also
 Safarnama, an 11th-century travel Persian travel book by Nasir Khusraw